Richard Francis Nolan (February 4, 1939 – December 13, 2005) was a Canadian musician, from Newfoundland. Nolan was known for performing Newfoundland folk music in Toronto night clubs. During his 50-year career he released more than 40 albums and recorded over 300 tracks. He is particularly known for his song "Aunt Martha's Sheep".

Early life
Nolan was born in Corner Brook. As a teenager he performed in a local band, the Blue Valley Boys, and sang on a Corner Brook radio show. Priscilla Boutcher, the former Mayor of Corner Brook, was Nolan's sister.

Career
In the 1950s Nolan moved to Toronto, where he played with local bands and worked at several jobs.  He began to record albums of the music of Johnny Cash and other country songs, earning him the nickname "The Johnny Cash of Newfoundland". His Blue Valley Boys, which included Corner Brook native Roy Penney, performed regularly at the Horseshoe Tavern, backing up visiting country singers.

In the 1960s he switched his focus to traditional Newfoundland music and released many albums. One album, Fisherman's Boy, contained Nolan's signature song Aunt Martha's Sheep and went platinum in just three months. Another signature song of his was I's the B'y.

Two more gold albums followed, and in 1972 he had a hit song, "Home Again This Year". That year he was the editor for the folk song collection Newfoundland Songs, published by the Bennett Brewing Company. He continued to release albums of country music and Newfoundland folk songs regularly for many years.

Nolan appeared at the Grand Ole Opry and national television programs, was nominated for a Juno Award, hosted his own television series and in November 2005, was awarded the Lifetime Achievement Award from the Music Industry Association of Newfoundland and Labrador.

In 2009 Dick Nolan was posthumously awarded the Dr. Helen Creighton Lifetime Achievement Award by the East Coast Music Association.

Discography

Albums

Singles

References

External links
Official Website
Dick Nolan at The Canadian Encyclopedia, accessed August 31, 2019
http://www.heritage.nf.ca/articles/arts/dick-nolan.php
http://collections.mun.ca/cdm/ref/collection/cns_enl/id/4199

1939 births
2005 deaths
People from Corner Brook
Musicians from Newfoundland and Labrador
Canadian country singer-songwriters
20th-century Canadian male singers